A Yank at Oxford is a 1938 comedy-drama film directed by Jack Conway and starring Robert Taylor, Lionel Barrymore, Maureen O'Sullivan, Vivien Leigh and Edmund Gwenn. The screenplay was written by John Monk Saunders and Leon Gordon. The film was produced by MGM-British at Denham Studios.

A Yank at Oxford was Vivien Leigh and Robert Taylor's first film appearance together; they would later appear as the romantic lead couple in the remake of Waterloo Bridge (1940). Before this film, Taylor was seen as the "romantic love interest" and thus as a 1930s equivalent to Rudolph Valentino, with men therefore starting to doubt Taylor's masculinity. His casting in this film (by Mayer) was a successful attempt to put paid to such doubts, and dramatically boosted his reputation with both men and women.

Plot
A cocky American athlete named Lee Sheridan (Robert Taylor) receives a scholarship to attend Cardinal College, University of Oxford in 1937. At first, Lee is reluctant to go to the college owing to his father, Dan's, (Lionel Barrymore) limited income, but he finally does attend. Once in England, Lee brags about his athletic triumphs to Paul Beaumont (Griffith Jones), Wavertree (Robert Coote), and Ramsey (Peter Croft) on the train to Oxford. Annoyed, they trick Lee into getting off the train at the wrong stop. Lee, however, does make his way to Oxford where the students attempt to trick him again, this time into thinking that he is getting a grand reception. Seeing through the deception, he follows the prankster impersonating the Dean and after chasing him is thrown off and ends up kicking the real Dean of Cardinal (Edmund Gwenn) before retreating. This begins a contentious relationship between them when Lee reports to apologize.

Lee considers leaving Oxford but stays on after being convinced by Scatters (Edward Rigby), his personal servant. Lee meets Elsa Craddock (Vivien Leigh), a married woman who "helps" the new campus students, and starts a relationship with Paul Beaumont's sister Molly (Maureen O'Sullivan). Lee makes the track team by outpacing other runners while wearing a cap and gown. Just when he begins to fit in, he is hazed for refusing to rest during a crucial relay race at a track meet and pushing his replacement Paul out of the way in his zeal to win. In a fit of anger, Lee goes to a pub, which students are forbidden to frequent, to confront Paul, finding him in a private booth with Elsa. He starts a fight with Paul but Wavertree warns them of the arrival of the Oxford University police, the "Bullers". Lee and Paul run and when they are almost caught by one of the Bullers, Lee punches him. Paul is called before the Dean, who fines him and warns him for hitting the Buller. He is scorned for revealing it was Lee who did it, and Lee is soon the favorite of Paul's old friends. Molly begins to see Lee again, but he still feels regretful for what has happened between him and Paul.

Lee begins rowing for Oxford University Boat Club and in the bumps race for Cardinal's boat club, tries to make amends to Paul after winning a race, but Paul rejects the offer of friendship. Despite this, Lee still helps Paul by hiding Elsa in his own room when Elsa is looking for Paul. The Dean catches the two of them together and expels Lee from Oxford. Lee's father, Dan, comes for the races having not heard of Lee's expulsion from Oxford University. When Lee tells him that he had been having an affair with Elsa, Dan believes he is lying. Judging from Lee's effusive letters about Molly, he feels that Lee could not possibly have had an affair with Elsa.

Dan meets with Molly and the two devise a plan to get Lee back into college. Dan meets with Elsa at the bookstore and convinces her to talk to the Dean. After flirting with the Dean and telling him that Lee was only hiding her from Wavertree, Lee is allowed back into Oxford and Wavertree, who has spent the entire story trying to be expelled so he can come into an inheritance, receives to his disappointment only a minor punishment. Lee and Paul make amends and win the boat race.

Cast

 Robert Taylor as Lee Sheridan
 Lionel Barrymore as Dan Sheridan
 Maureen O'Sullivan as Molly Beaumont
 Vivien Leigh as Elsa Craddock
 Edmund Gwenn as Dean of Cardinal
 Griffith Jones as Paul Beaumont
 C. V. France as Dean Snodgrass
 Edward Rigby as Scatters
 Morton Selten as Cecil Davidson, Esq.
 Claude Gillingwater as Ben Dalton
 Tully Marshall as Cephas  
 Walter Kingsford as Dean Williams  
 Robert Coote as Wavertree
 Peter Croft as Ramsey  
 Noel Howlett as Tom Craddock
 Ronald Shiner as bicycle repairman (uncredited)
 Jon Pertwee as extra (uncredited, his first film)

Production

A Yank at Oxford was MGM's first British production, with MGM head Louis B. Mayer taking a personal interest in casting. He visited the set several times. British playwright Roland Pertwee was one of several uncredited writers, and F. Scott Fitzgerald also spent three weeks working on the script, touching up rough points and adding pieces of dialogue. Mayer and Balcon later got into a fight on set, within earshot of Vivien Leigh and Maureen O'Sullivan, that led to Balcon resigning as the producer.

To the surprise of other actors, Taylor was able to do all of the physical scenes himself, especially running and rowing. He had competed in track and field as a student at Doane College.

At first, Mayer was reluctant to cast the then little known Vivien Leigh in the role of Elsa Craddock, until persuaded by Michael Balcon, who stated that she was already living in Britain and it would cost much more to fly someone else out to England. During the filming of A Yank at Oxford, Leigh gained a reputation for being "difficult" to work with. According to her biographer Alexander Walker, Leigh felt judged by Maureen O'Sullivan, whom she had befriended years earlier at school, because O'Sullivan was happily married and Leigh was in the midst of an affair with Laurence Olivier and awaiting word of a divorce from her first husband, Leigh Holman. Therefore, the relationship was "strained." Also Leigh had developed a foot problem whereupon she asked to go to London to seek treatment. As Leigh was preparing to leave, the wardrobe department cut a hole in her shoes so that her toe would be at ease.

According to Leigh, she was forced to pay for her own shoes and demanded that MGM help her make some of the payments. On the other hand, MGM said that they bought all of Leigh's shoes and she didn't have to pay a penny on the film. Because of the dispute, her manager, Alexander Korda, sent Leigh a message stating that if her behaviour did not improve, he would not renew her contract. Leigh's behaviour did shape up and her contract was renewed.

Some film historians believe A Yank at Oxford was instrumental in Vivien Leigh being noticed by David O. Selznick for Gone with the Wind. Regardless of her prior behavior, Leigh managed to make her way through the filming of A Yank at Oxford without much additional acrimony and made an impression on her costar, Robert Taylor. Taylor returned to Hollywood talking about the great English actress he had worked with and suggested to Selznick, who was still searching for his Scarlett O'Hara, that they ought to look at her.

Reception
A Yank at Oxford was reviewed by Frank S. Nugent in The New York Times as a "pleasant spoof." He wrote that the film "turns out to be an uncommonly diverting show. It can't be the story, for we've read the one about the old college spirit before. ... It must be the accents, the caps and gown, the cycles and the remarkably credible chaps Metro hired to play dean and tutor, scout and students. When the camera turns upon them you can jolly well smell the fog, you know."

The film review in Variety concentrated on Taylor's appeal. "Robert Taylor brings back from Oxford an entertaining rah-rah film which is full of breathless quarter-mile dashes, heartbreaking boat race finishes and surefire sentiment—Metro's first British-made film under Hollywood supervision and with Hollywood principals and director."

A Yank at Oxford and A Yank at Eton (1942), portrayed the British in a mainly positive light, and set the scene for other films that were financially successful in both the United States and the United Kingdom during the war years. The film was later parodied in the Laurel and Hardy film A Chump at Oxford (1940) and remade as Oxford Blues (1984) .

Box office
According to MGM records, the film earned $1,291,000 in the US and Canada and $1,445,000 elsewhere resulting in a profit of $513,000.

See also
 Lionel Barrymore filmography

References
Notes

Bibliography

 Capus, Michelangelo. Vivien Leigh: A Biography. Jefferson, North Carolina: McFarland & Company, 2003. .
 Glancy, H. Mark. When Hollywood Loved Britain: The Hollywood 'British' Film 1939-1945. Manchester, UK: Manchester University Press, 1999. .
 Taylor, John Russell. Vivien Leigh. London: Elm Tree Books, 1984. .
 Vickers, Hugo. Vivien Leigh: A Biography. London: Little, Brown and Company, 1988 edition. .
 Walker, Alexander. Vivien: The Life of Vivien Leigh. New York: Grove Press, 1987. .
 Wayne, Jane Ellen. Robert Taylor. New York: Warner Paperback Library, 1973. .

External links
 
 
 
 

1938 films
1938 comedy-drama films
British black-and-white films
British comedy-drama films
Films directed by Jack Conway
Films set in 1937
Films set in England
Films set in Oxford
Films set in universities and colleges
Films shot at Denham Film Studios
Metro-Goldwyn-Mayer films
Rowing films
Films produced by Michael Balcon
Films with screenplays by John Paddy Carstairs
Films scored by Edward Ward (composer)
1930s English-language films
1930s British films